Enrique Lihn Carrasco (3 September 1929 – 10 July 1988) was a Chilean poet, playwright, and novelist. The son of Enrique Lihn Doll and María Carrasco Délano, he married Ivette Mingram (1932–2008). They had  one daughter, the actress Andrea María Lihn Mingram. Linh was born in Santiago, Chile. He aspired to be a painter but after a failed attempt at pursuing this ambition during university he abandoned that dream to pursue writing. He proceeded to develop into a  poet, playwright, and novelist and would teach literature at the University of Chile. Lihn viewed both the past and the future as forms of death, and his emphasis on this point is evident throughout his literary works. His work revolved around his anger for the contemporary dictatorship, as Chile was governed by a military junta.  Works layered with social, political, and religious commentary are common throughout Lihn's canon. In 1963 he received the Atenea Award, in 1966 he won the Casa de las Américas Award in Cuba and in 1977 he received the Guggenheim Fellowship to study museology. His final book, Diario de Muerte was written in the six weeks preceding his death from cancer in Santiago. The evening before his death, he corrected the proofs.

A fictionalized version of Lihn appeared in Alejandro Jodorowsky's autobiographical film Endless Poetry (2016) performed by Leandro Taub.

Notable works

Poems
"The Dark Room"
"Cemetery in Punta Arenas"
"Six Poems of Loneliness"
"Torture Chamber"
'"Of All Despondencies"
"A Favourite Little Shrine"
"Goodnight, Achilles"

Film
Adiós a Tarzán, directed by Enrique Lihn & Pedro Pablo Celedón.

Novels
"Batman in Chile"
"The Crystal Orchestra"
"The art of the word"

Works in English
The Dark Room and Other Poems, transl. by Jonathan Cohen, John Felstiner, and David Unger, 1978, New Directions
Figures of Speech, transl. by Dave Oliphant, 1999, Host Publications, Inc.

Notes

External links
 Enrique Lihn papers, 1941-1988. Research Library at the Getty Research Institute. Los Angeles, California..
 Enrique Lihn webpage

1929 births
1988 deaths
Chilean male poets
Chilean male dramatists and playwrights
20th-century Chilean poets
20th-century Chilean male writers
20th-century Chilean dramatists and playwrights
Deaths from cancer in Chile
Male novelists